A forlorn hope is a band of soldiers or other combatants chosen to take the vanguard in a military operation, such as a suicidal assault through the kill zone of a defended position, or the first men to climb a scaling ladder against a defended fortification, where the risk of casualties is high.

Etymology
The term comes from the Dutch , literally 'lost heap'. The term was used in military contexts to denote a troop formation.

The Dutch word  (in its sense of 'heap' in English) is not cognate with English 'hope': this is an example of folk etymology. This folk etymology has been strengthened by the fact that in Dutch, the word  is a homograph meaning "hope" as well as "heap", although the two senses have different etymologies.

History
These men carried long double-handed swords, with which they had to hew their way through the massive pike formations opposing them. Alternatively, a  small force of  could be used as "bait", to draw forward enemy formations and so expose them to the main force of Landsknecht behind. They also had to withstand the first wave of attacks when defending a breastwork. Members of the  earned double pay, thus giving them the name of Doppelsöldner ('Double-wagers'). Since there were not enough volunteers for this assignment, criminals who had been sentenced to death were taken into the ranks as well. As a field sign, the  carried a red  ('Blood Banner').

By extension, the term forlorn hope became used for any body of troops placed in a hazardous position, e.g., an exposed outpost, or the defenders of an outwork in advance of the main defensive position. This usage was especially common in accounts of the English Civil War, as well as in the British Army in the Peninsular War of 1808–1814. In the days of muzzle-loading muskets, the term was most frequently used to refer to the first wave of soldiers attacking a breach in defenses during a siege.

While it was likely that most members of the forlorn hope would be killed or wounded, the intention was that some would survive long enough to seize a foothold that could be reinforced, or, at least, that a second wave with better prospects could be sent in while the defenders were reloading or engaged in mopping up the remnants of the first wave.

A forlorn hope may have been composed of volunteers and conscripted criminals, and were frequently led by ambitious junior officers with hopes of personal advancement: if the volunteers survived, and performed courageously, they would be expected to benefit in the form of promotions, cash gifts, and added glory to their name (a military tradition at least as old as the Roman Republic). The commanding officer was virtually guaranteed both a promotion and a long-term boost to his career prospects if he survived.

In consequence, despite the grave risks involved for all concerned, there was often serious competition for the opportunity to lead such an assault and to display conspicuous valor.

The French equivalent of the forlorn hope, called  ('The Lost Children'), were all guaranteed promotion should they survive. Both enlisted men and officers joined the dangerous mission as an opportunity to raise themselves in the army.

See also
 Banzai charge
 Battle of Sari Bair
 Berserker
 Second Battle of Fort Wagner
 Cannon fodder
 Battle of Halidzor
 Frontal assault
 Inghimasi
 Kamikaze
 Penal military unit
 Shock troops
 Suicide attack
 Suicide mission

References

Military slang and jargon
Siege tactics